Ostara or Ostara, Briefbücherei der Blonden und Mannesrechtler (Ostara, Newsletter of the Blonde and Masculists) was a German nationalist magazine founded in 1905 by the occultist Lanz von Liebenfels in Vienna, Austria, and in which he published anti-semitic and Völkisch theories.

Lanz derived the name of the publication from the reconstructed Old High German goddess name *Ôstarâ. Lanz claimed that the Ostrogoths and the nation of Austria (German: Österreich) were matronymically named after this goddess. In his study of Lanz von Liebenfels, the Austrian psychologist Wilfried Daim states that "most likely this is even greater nonsense."

According to von Liebenfels, the magazine had a peak circulation of 100,000 and appeared in three series; the first series included anywhere from 89 to 100 issues between 1905 and 1917, the second series had only one issue, and the third series included 20 issues published c. 1930–1931.

Adolf Hitler was reportedly one of the publication's readers in his late teens, and there is speculation that it served as a catalyst for his antisemitism. After Hitler's rise to prominence in the 1920s, Lanz tried to be recognized as one of his ideological precursors. In the preface of issue one in the 3rd series of Ostara, c. 1927, he wrote:

Hitler, however, refused to acknowledge any debt to Lanz and his paper. After Austria was annexed by Nazi Germany in 1938, Lanz hoped for Hitler's patronage, but Hitler banned him from publishing his writings, and most notably copies of Ostara were removed from circulation. After the war, Lanz accused Hitler of having not only stolen but corrupted his idea, and also of being of "inferior racial stock".

See also
 German nationalism in Austria
 Germanic mysticism

References

 

1905 establishments in Austria-Hungary
1930 disestablishments in Austria
Antisemitic publications
Defunct magazines published in Austria
Defunct political magazines
German-language magazines
Magazines established in 1905
Magazines disestablished in 1930
Magazines published in Vienna
Modern paganism in Germany
Modern pagan magazines
Western esoteric magazines